Xanthopan is a monotypic genus of sphinx moth, with Xanthopan morganii (often misspelled as "morgani"), commonly called Morgan's sphinx moth, as its sole species. It is a very large sphinx moth from Southern Africa (Zimbabwe, Zambia, Malawi) and Madagascar. Little is known about its biology, though the adults have been found to visit orchids and are one of the main pollinators of several of the Madagascar endemic baobab (Adansonia) species, Adansonia perrieri or Perrier's baobab.

Overview

In January 1862 while researching insect pollination of orchids, Charles Darwin received a package of orchids from the distinguished horticulturist James Bateman, and in a follow up letter with a second package Bateman's son Robert confirmed the names of the specimens, including Angraecum sesquipedale from Madagascar. The name "sesquipedale" is Latin for "one and a half feet", referring to the spur length.

From his observations and experiments with pushing a probe into the spur of the flower, Darwin surmised in his 1862 book Fertilisation of Orchids that there must be a pollinator moth with a proboscis long enough to reach the nectar at the end of the spur. In its attempt to get the nectar at the end of the spur the moth would get pollen rubbed off on its head. The next orchid it visited would then be pollinated in the same manner.

In 1867 Alfred Russel Wallace published an article in which he supported Darwin's hypothesis, remarking that the African sphinx moth Xanthopan morganii (then known as Macrosila morganii) had a proboscis almost long enough to reach the bottom of the spur. In a footnote to this article Wallace wrote "That such a moth exists in Madagascar may be safely predicted; and naturalists who visit that island should search for it with as much confidence as astronomers searched for the planet Neptune,—and they will be equally successful!"

Subsequently, the sphingid experts Walter Rothschild and Karl Jordan received one male and one female specimen of Xanthopan morganii (commonly called Morgan's sphinx moth) with an especially long proboscis, collected on Madagascar by Charles Oberthür and Paul Mabille. Since Wallace predicted that the mystery pollinator would turn out to be a sphinx moth, rather than simply a large moth as Darwin had suggested, the Madagascan form was named subspecies praedicta by Walter Rothschild and Karl Jordan, in honour of Wallace's (not Darwin's) prediction. Darwin's earlier, but less specific, prediction was not even mentioned by them. The Madagascan subspecies is known as Wallace's sphinx moth and it differs from the African form by having a pink, rather than white, breast and abdomen and a black apical line on the forewing, which is broader than in mainland specimens. Molecular clock models using either rate- or fossil-based calibrations imply that the Madagascan subspecies X. morganii praedicta and the African subspecies X. morganii morganii diverged 7.4 ± 2.8 Mya, which overlaps the divergence of A. sesquipedale from its sister, A. sororium, namely 7.5 ± 5.2 Mya. Since both these orchids have extremely long spurs, long spurs likely existed before that and were exploited by long-tongued moths similar to Xanthopan morganii praedicta. The long geological separation of the subspecies morganii and praedicta matches their morphological differences in the colour of breast and abdomen.

Morgan's sphinx moth approaches the flower to ascertain by scent whether or not it is the correct orchid species. Then the moth backs up over a foot and unrolls its proboscis, then flies forward, inserting it into the orchid's spur.

The larvae feed on Annona senegalensis, Hexalobus crispiflorus, Uvaria, Ibaria and Xylopia species.

References 

Sphingini
Moths described in 1856
Moths of Africa
Moths of the Comoros
Moths of Madagascar
Orchid pollinators
Monotypic moth genera